Sigmocycloceras is a nautiloid cephalopod discovered in the Middle Ordovician of Korea, said to be similar to Sactorthoceras, and included in the Sactorthoceratidae, but unique in being longitudinally sigmoid and sculpted with transverse annuli.

References
 Walter C Sweet 1964.  Nautiloidea-Orthocerida; Treatise on Invertebrate Paleontology, Part K.  Geol Soc of America and Univ. Kansas Press.

Nautiloids